Dybów may refer to the following places:
Dybów, Łódź Voivodeship (central Poland)
Dybów, Lubusz Voivodeship (west Poland)
Dybów, Masovian Voivodeship (east-central Poland)